"Don't Go Breaking My Heart" is a song by American vocal group Backstreet Boys. The song was released on May 17, 2018 as the lead single to their ninth studio album DNA (their eighth in the US). The single peaked at number 63 on the Billboard Hot 100, which is their first song as lead artist on the chart since "Inconsolable" in 2007, and their highest-charted single since "Incomplete" in 2005.  The song received a Grammy Nomination for “Best Pop Duo/Group” for the 2019 ceremony, their first nomination since "Shape of My Heart" at the 2002 ceremony.

Commercial performance
"Don't Go Breaking My Heart" debuted on May 17, 2018, and in its first week ranked 22nd in digital sales. The song was deemed by many in the media as a comeback song for the band as it represented their first time charting on the Billboard Hot 100, Mainstream Top 40, and Adult Contemporary charts since "Inconsolable". It was also their highest-charting single on the Adult Top 40 with a peak of number 9, surpassing the number 11 peak of "I Want It That Way" in 1999. In regards to airplay the song reached number 38 on the Radio Songs chart, the band's first time on that chart since "Incomplete".

Track listing

Charts

Weekly charts

Year-end charts

Certifications

Release history

References

2018 singles
2018 songs
Backstreet Boys songs
Songs written by Wrabel
Songs written by Jamie Hartman
Songs written by Stuart Crichton